Two Guns is a ghost town in Coconino County, Arizona, United States.

History

Early history
Native artifacts found at Two Guns have been dated to between 1050 and 1600.

As white settlers began to populate the area in the mid-19th century, Two Guns was recognized as an ideal place to cross Canyon Diablo, first by wagon, then later by vehicle.

Two Guns was the site of a mass murder of Apaches by their Navajo enemies in 1878.  Some Apaches had hidden in a cave at Two Guns to avoid detection, but were discovered by the Navajos, who lit sagebrush fires at the cave's exit and shot any Apaches trying to escape.  The fire asphyxiated 42 Apaches, after which they were stripped of their valuables.  The murder site is referred to as the "death cave". (However this story has been disputed).

During the winter of 1879–80, Billy the Kid and his outlaw gang hid in the ruins of a stone house and corral on the west rim of Canyon Diablo, across from Two Guns.

In 1880, long before Two Guns was established as a settlement, the construction of the Santa Fe Railway was progressing across northern Arizona. A settlement populated by male work crews was established near the construction site and was named Canyon Diablo, after the nearby canyon. The settlement "quickly became a wild and lawless place as drifters, gamblers, and outlaws made their way to town". Four men employed by the Hashknife Ranch robbed the train at Canyon Diablo in 1889, then fled on horseback with $100,000 in currency, 2,500 new silver dollars, and $40,000 in gold coins, as well as silver watches, jewelry, and diamonds. A posse led by sheriff Buckey O'Neill pursued the bandits, but recovered less than $100 when the men were captured. Years later, after release from prison, one of the thieves disclosed that the stolen goods, along with their rifles, had been buried in the canyon rim near Two Guns. The location remains popular with treasure hunters.

The National Old Trails Highway (called the "Santa Fe Highway" in Arizona) was built in 1907 in Arizona, and loosely followed the railway.  The highway crossed the dry river bed of Canyon Diablo at the Two Guns location, and zig-zagged up and down each embankment.  In 1915, Canyon Diablo Bridge opened at the Two Guns crossing, and was used until 1938 when a new bridge was built nearby.

Settlement

The first settler at Two Guns was Ed Randolph, who built a store next to the death cave.

In 1922, Earle and Louise Cundiff purchased  of land from Randolph at this location for $1,000, and built a store, restaurant, and gasoline pumps.

Harry E. Miller leased a property from the Cundiffs in 1925 and began extensive construction.  Calling himself "Chief Crazy Thunder", Miller wanted to capitalize on the beauty of Canyon Diablo and the flow of passing tourists.  Along the canyon rim, Miller erected a zoo with cages made of brick, mortar, and chicken wire; his zoo animals included mountain lions, cougars, Gila monsters, coral snakes, birds, and a lynx.  A restaurant and Indian gift shop were opened, and Miller cleaned out the death cave, selling any Apache skulls found inside as souvenirs.
For a fee, visitors were led on a tour that began at a Hopi house Miller had built, where rolls of colored piki bread were made and sold.  Tourists then followed a paved path down the side of the canyon to a soft drink stand at the bottom.  Next was a tour of the death cave, where Miller had installed electric lights, and fake ruins of cliff dwellers.  Flamboyant signs were placed along the highway, and Miller named his establishment "Fort Two Guns" as an homage to silent movie actor William S. "Two Guns" Hart, with whom Miller claimed to have previously worked. The Cundiffs applied for a post office under the name "Two Guns" in 1924, but it was refused.  The post office was renamed "Canyon Lodge".

In 1925, "Rimmy" Jim Giddings opened a gas station and cafe at Two Guns called Rimmy Jim's. Another location burned down in 1969. In 1926, the highway designation was changed to U.S. Route 66.  That same year, Cundiff and Miller had a disagreement about the details of their lease, and Miller shot the unarmed Cundiff to death.  He was later acquitted of the killing. The interior of Miller's store burned in 1929, and soon after, Louise Cundiff built her own tourist store.  The following year, Miller left the state.  Cundiff remarried, and in 1934 opened the Two Guns Texaco service station along a new alignment of Route 66. Behind it, they relocated the zoo (which closed prior to 1950).

In 1938, a new bridge across Canyon Diablo was built, and Route 66 began following Interstate 40 at the Two Guns location. A more modern service station was built at Two Guns in 1963, and in the late 1960s a motel, western tavern, reptile exhibit, and new zoo were added.  Later, a Shell service station was built and a KOA campground opened.

Decline
The service station burned in 1971, and Two Guns began to decline. The ruins of many former structures remain, including the trading post, campground, old cottages, zoo, and burned-out service station. In 1988, Canyon Diablo Bridge was added to the National Register of Historic Places.

See also

 List of historic properties in Two Guns, Arizona

References

External links

 Two Guns – ghosttowns.com

Former populated places in Coconino County, Arizona
Ghost towns in Arizona
Ghost towns on U.S. Route 66
Populated places established in 1922
1922 establishments in Arizona